is a former Japanese football player.

Playing career
Sato was born in Saga on September 14, 1975. After graduating from high school, he joined Cerezo Osaka in 1994. However he could not play at all in the match until 1996. In 1997, he moved to Japan Football League club Sagan Tosu based in his local. He played as regular player from 1997. The club was promoted to J2 League on 1999. He retired end of 1999 season.

Club statistics

References

External links

1975 births
Living people
Association football people from Saga Prefecture
Japanese footballers
J1 League players
J2 League players
Japan Football League (1992–1998) players
Cerezo Osaka players
Sagan Tosu players
Association football forwards